Boston Playwrights' Theatre (BPT) is a small professional theatre in Boston, Massachusetts. Led by artistic director Megan Sandberg-Zakian, it is the home of the Graduate Playwriting Program at Boston University. As a venue, BPT rents its space to host other New England theatre companies who are producing new plays.

History 
Founded in 1981 by poet, playwright and Nobel laureate Derek Walcott. The program's alumni have been produced in regional and New York houses, as well as in London's West End.

In 2022, artistic director Kate Snodgrass retired after 35 years of working at Boston University. Megan Sandberg-Zakian succeeded her as the theater's artistic director and playwright Nathan Alan Davis as the head of Boston University's MFA Playwriting Program. The building's front theater was subsequently named the Kate Snodgrass Theater, and its back theater the Derek Walcott Theater.

Partnership with Boston University 
In 2014, Boston Playwrights' Theatre produced its first season of thesis plays by current MFA candidates under the name @Play Festival of New Work in collaboration with Boston University. In 2016, Boston Playwrights' Theatre made official this partnership with Boston University's School of Theatre and the BU Graduate School of Arts & Sciences on a series of MFA Playwriting thesis plays acting as a showcase for pieces written by graduating students in BU's MFA playwriting program. In a major change for BPT, almost all of the onstage and backstage talent is provided by students in BU's theater school, who work closely with the playwrights throughout the year.

In alternating seasons, Boston Playwrights’ Theatre will resume its practice of featuring three plays, written by alumni or faculty of the program and employing professional actors, designers and playwrights to stage them.

See also
Playwrights' Platform

References

External links
Boston Playwrights' Theatre
Boston Theater Marathon

1981 establishments in Massachusetts
Theatres in Boston